The National Basketball Association Most Valuable Player Award (MVP) is an annual National Basketball Association (NBA) award given since the 1955–56 season to the best performing player of the regular season. Starting with the 2022–23 season, winners receive the Michael Jordan Trophy, named for the five-time MVP often considered the best player in NBA history.

Prior to 2021, the winner received the Maurice Podoloff Trophy, which was named in honor of the first commissioner (then president) of the NBA, who served from 1946 until 1963. With the switch to the Michael Jordan Trophy, his name was moved to a new Maurice Podoloff Trophy given to the team with the best regular season record.

Each member of the voting panel casts a vote for first to fifth place selections. Each first-place vote is worth 10 points; each second-place vote is worth seven; each third-place vote is worth five, fourth-place is worth three and fifth-place is worth one. Starting from 2010, one ballot was cast by fans through online voting. The player with the highest point total wins the award. Jokić is the lowest draft pick to win the award, being selected 41st by Denver in the 2014 NBA draft.

Every player who has won this award and has been eligible for the Naismith Memorial Basketball Hall of Fame has been inducted. Kareem Abdul-Jabbar won the award a record six times. He is also the only player to win the award despite his team not making the playoffs back in the  season. Both Bill Russell and Michael Jordan won the award five times, while Wilt Chamberlain and LeBron James won the award four times. Russell and James are the only players to have won the award four times in five seasons. Moses Malone, Larry Bird and Magic Johnson each won the award three times, while Bob Pettit, Karl Malone, Tim Duncan, Steve Nash, Stephen Curry, Giannis Antetokounmpo and Nikola Jokić have each won it twice. Russell, Chamberlain, and Bird are the only players to win the award in three consecutive years. Hakeem Olajuwon of Nigeria, Duncan of the U.S. Virgin Islands, Nash of Canada, Dirk Nowitzki of Germany, Antetokounmpo of Greece, and Jokić of Serbia are the only MVP winners considered "international players" by the NBA.

Curry in 2015–16 is the only player to have won the award unanimously. Shaquille O'Neal in 1999–2000 and LeBron James in 2012–13 are the only two players to have fallen one vote shy of a unanimous selection, both receiving 120 of 121 votes.

Winners

Multi-time winners

Teams

See also 

 Bill Russell NBA Finals Most Valuable Player Award
 NBA Conference Finals Most Valuable Player Award
 NBA All-Star Game Kobe Bryant Most Valuable Player Award
 NBA G League Most Valuable Player Award
 NBL (United States) Most Valuable Player Award

Notes

References 
General

 
 
 

Specific

Most Valuable
National Basketball Association lists
Awards established in 1956
National Basketball Association most valuable player awards
Basketball most valuable player awards
1956 establishments in the United States